Paweł Aleksander Maria Tarnowski (born April 3, 1994, in Gdynia) is a Polish sailor, son of Jacek Tarnowski, (businessman and the politician, in 2005-2006 Head of the Chancellery of the Polish Prime Minister)  and Monika Wanicka. Tarnowski already competed at the top-level when he was a teenager, becoming a multiple medal winner in Junior World Championships. In 2011 and 2012, he won a gold medal at the RS:X Junior World Championships, and he won medals in European Champion. In first he started in classes Techno 293 Class and at present RS:X, (including in a category age under 17 (U-17) and under 21  years of age (U-21). 
He is sometimes seen as a model in commercials, including polish company Atlas  or on the cover of album Superheroes : Chapter One - Courage of the band Synthphonia.

Achievements

References

External links

 
 
 
 video clips on Vimeo.com

1994 births
Living people
Polish windsurfers
People from Sopot
Sportspeople from Pomeranian Voivodeship